Thullum Kaalam is a 2005 Indian Tamil language drama film directed and written by A. Sarana, making his directorial debut. The film stars newcomers: Shankar, Heera and Megha, with Vineetha, Rajeev, Sriman, Pallavi, Rajini Nivetha and Kumarimuthu playing supporting roles. The film had musical score by S. P. Boopathy and was released on 29 July 2005.

Plot

Sindhuraj alias Sindhu  is a carefree plus two student who lives in Polur with his elder sister Porkodi. Porkodi is the village teacher whereas his elder brother, Santhosh, is an upright military officer. Porkodi lives only for her brothers and would do anything for her brothers. Sindhu always hangs out with his friends and enjoys teasing the villagers. Tamizhselvi is hard-working and a "haughty plus two" student who hates her cousin Sindhu. After successfully passing the exam, Sindhu and his friends decide to pursue a bachelor's degree in science and apply to one of the colleges in the city.

At the college, his college mate Divya  fall in love with him, she is from a rich background. At the annual inter-college competition, Sindhu sings a song and won the first prize making the college proud. Later, Santhosh, on the holiday, returns to his village from the military camp. Her sister wants her brother Santhosh to marry her cousin Thamizhselvi but Thamizhselvi refuses to marry him for not getting enough money and humiliates them. When Divya wanted to introduce her lover Sindhu to her parents, Sindhu stood them up for various reasons. The first time, he got an opportunity to sing in a concert, so Divya's parents were understanding. While the second time, it was the last of college, therefore, his friends and he celebrated and got drunk, Divya and her parents were disappointed that he did not come. Worried about Sindhu, Divya goes to his college dorm and she sees the drunk Sindhu talks ill about her. The next day, Sindhu realizes his mistake and apologizes to Divya. Divya, who sincerely loved him, tells him that he was too reckless and immature to be her life partner. Divya and her parents are about to move to the United States and before leaving, she tells Sindhu that he has missed an opportunity to make it big in life.

Thereafter, all his friends decide to pursue a master's degree in science while Sindhu must clear all his arrears to complete his bachelor degree. Sindhu finds himself alone, isolated and mocked by the villagers. In the meantime, Thamizhselvi, who refused to wed grooms for not being rich enough, finally agrees to marry a doctor when she discovers that her mother has cardiovascular disease. The day of the wedding, the groom demands a huge dowry but Thamizhselvi's mother tells them that she does not have that much money and the wedding is cancelled. The carefree Sindhu and arrogant Thamizhselvi, who both fail in life, decide to marry. Sindhu then gets an opportunity to sing in a feature film. The film ends with Sindhu and Thamizhselvi living happily.

Cast

Shankar as Sindhuraj alias Sindhu
Heera as Thamizhselvi
Megha as Divya
Vineetha as Porkodi
Rajeev as Divya's father
Sriman as Meter Govind
Pallavi as Divya's mother
Rajini Nivetha as Thamizhselvi's mother
Kumarimuthu as Ekambaram
Kadhal Sukumar as Sindhu's friend
Kottachi as Sindhu's friend
Bayilvan Ranganathan
Manager Cheena
Murugan as Santhosh
Mimicry Senthil as Ganesh,  Sindhu's friend
Tharika as an item number
Viveka in a cameo appearance

Production 
Shankar stars in the film along with two newcomers Heera and Megha while Vineetha, his real life sister, plays his sister on-screen.

Soundtrack

The film score and the soundtrack were composed by S. P. Boopathy. The soundtrack, released in 2005, features 5 tracks with lyrics written by Viveka, Victor Doss and Dr. Kiruthaya.

References

2005 films
2000s Tamil-language films
Indian drama films
2005 directorial debut films
2005 drama films